The  is an inactive professional wrestling championship in the Japanese promotion DDT Pro-Wrestling. The title was established in 2009 when Umemura PC School, a Japanese cram school specialized in computer science, sponsored a match. The belt was made from a gold painted computer keyboard.

Title history
Danshoku Dino won the title at the "Kyōra Daiyon Kyōsatsu! in Nagoya 2009" event, on July 26, 2009 by defeating . He then defended it at Ryōgoku Peter Pan on August 23 against Masa Takanashi. The title was then unified with Dino's DDT Extreme Championship.

Reigns

See also

DDT Pro-Wrestling
Professional wrestling in Japan

References

DDT Pro-Wrestling championships